Shantytown Heritage Park, usually known as Shantytown, is a tourist attraction in the West Coast Region of the South Island of New Zealand. The town is surrounded by native forest, and is one of the region's most popular attractions.

History
Born out of the desire of the Greymouth community to preserve the West Coast gold-mining history, Shantytown was started by a group of local enthusiasts forming the West Coast Historical and Mechanical Society in 1968. Shantytown Heritage Park opened to the public on 23 January 1971. Most of the effort that has gone into the creation of Shantytown has been by volunteers and donated labour. Over the years, a collection of thousands of artefacts, ranging from gold-mining equipment to early settlers furniture, everyday items and clothing, as well as photographs, has been donated and collected from local people and businesses. 

The collection and wider heritage park focuses mainly on the Victorian era between the middle of the 19th century to before the Great War, but extends as far as the 1940s. Many of the items are displayed in an authentic setting in the heritage park, while the more precious and fragile items of the collection are held in temperature- and humidity-controlled storage due to the damp weather on the West Coast and are viewable by appointment. Today, Shantytown Heritage Park remains under the stewardship of a local board and continues its tradition of extensive community involvement.

Attractions
The township comprises two main streets lined with 30 historic buildings, including a church, and the two-storey coronation hall. The buildings are mostly original and transferred or re-built on site and house recreations of shops from around the late 19th century such as a bank, hotel, butcher, shoe shop, barber, carpenter, and a blacksmith.  Some of the shops sell goods, such as traditional lollies. The town also contains a hospital, train station, fire station, a Masonic Lodge, a church, and a jail.

A foundry showcases the craftsmanship, tools and techniques of ironwork via interactive displays and preserved historic equipment.

Adjacent to the main township, a "Chinatown" area depicts the life and living environment of Chinese immigrant gold miners who had migrated to the West Coast in the 1860s from other gold fields in New Zealand as they ran dry, as well as directly from China.

Shantytown also contains a re-created narrow-gauge bush tram line that follows a 19th-century sawmill tram track from the Shantytown train station to a stop at the Infants Creek Sawmill and a terminus 1.5 km from Shantytown for photo opportunities. Trains run throughout the day and are included in the admission.  The train station is built as a 3/4 replica of original railway plans.  Passengers can disembark at the Infants Creek Sawmill where a sluice gun is fired up to four times per day and tutored gold panning is available. The vintage passenger carriages are pulled by either "Gertie", an 1877 L-class steam engine from Avonside Engine Company in England, or by an 1896 improved F-class Kaitangata steam engine.

Other attractions include having an "old time" photo in costume taken, a holographic theatre show, and a playground.  Short bush walks around the area lead to a surveyors monument and lookout.

The town's inter-denominational church, built in 1866, can be booked for weddings, and there is an education centre funded by the New Zealand Ministry of Education which caters for school groups wanting hands-on history education.

Shantytown offers a cafe and souvenir shop, and is open all year round with the exception of Christmas Day.

Locomotives

See also 
 West Coast Historical and Mechanical Society

References

External links

Shantytown Heritage Park website

Grey District
Museums in the West Coast, New Zealand
West Coast Gold Rush